The coat of arms of Somalia was adopted on October 10, 1956 and features a golden framed shield of the Somali flag supported by two Cheetah standing on spears. The Cheetah is a common animal seen in Somalia. Cheetah are a common motif in Somali culture.

Official description
The Constitution of Somalia describes the coat of arms of the nation as follows:

The emblem of the Federal Republic of Somalia [...] is a blue shield with a gold frame, in the centre of which is a silver-coated, five-pointed star. The shield is surmounted by a decorated emblem with five golden heads, with two lateral ones halved. The shield is borne from the sides by two leopards facing each other under the lower point of the shield, along with two palm leaves, which are interlaced with a white ribbon.

Historical coats of arms

Subnational emblems

Armed Forces emblems 
The Armed Forces branches have unique emblems based on the national coat of arms.

External links
Somalia at Flags of the World

References

Somalia
National symbols of Somalia
Somali coats of arms
Somalia
Somalia
Somalia
Somalia